The Viaducts of Atlanta were mainly created in the 1920s to bridge numerous level crossings of roads and railroads.

Atlanta was founded as a railroad city. It had at least six major rail lines entering the city. There were many places where pedestrian traffic encountered that on the rails. The first viaduct was just the Broad Street bridge which was rebuilt several times, the second wooden version designed by Lemuel Grant in 1865 but longer viaducts were coming.

Downtown viaducts

 Mitchell Street (1899), which crosses the Central of Georgia Railway tracks
 Peachtree Street (opened October 9, 1901) at a cost of $76,662.38. Rebuilt (opened October 1, 2007) at a cost of $6.7 million
 Courtland Street (1906), which crosses the Georgia Railroad tracks. Demolished and rebuilt (opened October 8th, 2018). 
 Washington Street (1909), which crosses the Central of Georgia Railroad tracks
 Spring Street (opened December 20, 1923) – . Southern half rebuilt (1996), northern half being rebuilt (2014–2015).
 Pryor Street (1929) – 
 Central Avenue viaduct (1929) – 
 Hunter Street lateral – 
 Alabama Street lateral – 
 Wall Street lateral – 
 Techwood Drive Viaduct

Other viaducts

In January 1913, the Bellwood Viaduct was opened, allowing car and foot traffic to cross the railroad line parallel to Marietta Street to the west side of the city via Bellwood avenue (now Donald Lee Hollowell Parkway.).

Gallery of viaduct plaques

References
 Garrett, Franklin, Atlanta and Its Environs, 1954, University of Georgia Press.
 Hoffman, Phillip, "Creating Underground Atlanta, 1898-1932", Atlanta Historical Bulletin, Vol. XIII, No. 3, 1968

Notes

History of Atlanta
Roads in Atlanta